Ilıca is a town of Erzurum Province in the Eastern Anatolia region of Turkey. The mayor is Muhammed Cevdet Orhan(AKP).

References

Populated places in Erzurum Province
Towns in Turkey